Edward Thompson or variants may refer to:

Politicians
 Edward Thompson (of Sheriff Hutton) (c. 1639–1701), English landowner and politician
 Edward Thompson (1697–1742), British MP and Lord of the Admiralty
 Edward Thompson (FDNY Commissioner) (1913–1995), American firefighter, Fire Commissioner of New York City
 Edward Charles Thompson (1851–1933), Member of Parliament for North Monaghan, 1900–1906
 Edward Herbert Thompson (1857–1935), US diplomat and archaeologist
 Ed Thompson (Texas politician) (born 1950), American politician
 Ed Thompson (Wisconsin politician) (1944–2011), American businessman and politician

Sports
 Edward Thompson (footballer) (1894–1918), English footballer
 Eddie Thompson (businessman) (1940–2008), Scottish businessman and football club chairman
 Eddie Thompson (Canadian football) (1917–1943), Canadian football player and WW2 airman
 Eddie Thompson (cricketer) (1907–1982), English cricketer
 Eddie Thompson (rugby union) (1906–?), Australian rugby union player
 Ed Thompson (footballer) (born 1983), English football goalkeeper

Writers
 Edward Healy Thompson (1813–1891), English Roman Catholic writer
 Edward John Thompson (1886–1946), British scholar, novelist, historian and translator
 Edward Roffe Thompson (1891–1973), English author and journalist
 Edward Kramer Thompson (1907–1996), American writer and editor
 E. P. Thompson (1924–1993), British historian, socialist, author and peace campaigner

Other people
 Edward Thompson (actor) (1898–1960), American film actor
 Edward Maunde Thompson (1840–1929), British palaeographer
 Edward Thompson (engineer) (1881–1954), British railway engineer

 Edward Thompson (Royal Navy officer) (1738–1786), English commodore nicknamed "Poet Thompson" for his writings
 Eddie Thompson (musician) (1925–1986), English jazz pianist
 E. A. Thompson (Edward Arthur Thompson, 1914–1994), British historian

See also
Edward Thompson Hoke Wang, actually Naga Thein Hlaing (1933–2021), Burmese surgeon
 Edward Thomson (disambiguation)